Mabel's New Hero is a 1913 American short comedy film featuring Mabel Normand, Fatty Arbuckle, and The Keystone Cops.

Cast
 Mabel Normand as Mabel
 Roscoe 'Fatty' Arbuckle as Fatty
 Charles Inslee as Hansome Harry
 Virginia Kirtley as Mabel's friend
 Charles Avery as Cop
 Edgar Kennedy as Cop
 Hank Mann as Cop
 Nick Cogley
 The Keystone Cops

See also
 List of American films of 1913
 Fatty Arbuckle filmography

References

External links

 Mabel's New Hero on YouTube

1913 films
1913 comedy films
1913 short films
Silent American comedy films
American silent short films
American black-and-white films
Keystone Studios films
American comedy short films
Films directed by Mack Sennett
1910s American films